Neil Lonsdale (Christchurch, New Zealand 1907 - Henderson, New Zealand 1989) was a New Zealand commercial artist and cartoonist. He was the editorial cartoonist for the Auckland Star (1952-1968) and illustrated 'Over the teacups' for the New Zealand Woman's Weekly. He also drew 'panel gags' for New Zealand Pictorial in the mid-1950s. He retired in about 1975.

External links 
Search for work relating to Neil Lonsdale on DigitalNZ

References 

1907 births
1989 deaths
New Zealand cartoonists
New Zealand satirists
People from Christchurch